Sgùrr Dubh Mòr is a  mountain, a Munro, in the Cuillin range on the Isle of Skye in Scotland. It is slightly to the east of the main Cuillin ridge at the highest point of the Dubh ridge which extends eastwards to Loch Coruisk.

Geographical situation and topography
The summit (one of the sharpest in the Cuillin) is at the western end of the narrow summit ridge. The first ascent of the mountain was made in 1874 by Alexander Nicolson and  Duncan MacIntyre, a local forester and hillwalker. Sgùrr Dubh Beag lies a further one kilometre to the east beyond Sgùrr Dubh Mòr. These mountains are situated on the gabbro Dubh ridge which traverses east from Sgùrr Dubh an Da Bheinn and eventually reaches Loch Coruisk.

Climbing the mountain

The ascent to the top of Sgùrr Dubh Mòr via Dubh ridge from Loch Coruisk is one of the finest in Britain. The route involves not more than climbing graded as Moderate but a short abseil is normally made down from the top of Sgùrr Dubh Beag. The ascent up Coir' a' Grunnda from Glen Brittle is easier and shorter. The central route up the coire is craggy and preferable routes lie both to the north and south. Descents are possible west down Coire' a' Grunnda, southeast via Caisteal a' Garbh-choire to the coire itself, or south and then southeast traversing the southern section of the Cuillin ridge.

The southern slopes of the Dubh ridge are craggy and steep and are not inviting to climbers.

Notes

References

Citations

Works cited

Further reading

Mountains and hills of the Isle of Skye
Mountains and hills of Highland (council area)
Munros